Stella's lorikeet (Charmosyna stellae) is a species of parrot in the family Psittaculidae. It is endemic to New Guinea. Its natural habitat is subtropical or tropical moist montane forests.

Taxonomy
Stella's lorikeet was formerly considered conspecific with the Papuan lorikeet, but phylogenetic evidence indicates that both are distinct species, and it has thus been split by the IUCN Red List, BirdLife International, and the International Ornithologists' Union.

Stella's lorikeet has three recognized subspecies:

 C. s. stellae - southeastern New Guinea
 C. s. goliathina - western and central New Guinea
 C. s. wahnesi - endemic to the Huon Peninsula

References

Stella's lorikeet
Stella's lorikeet
Stella's lorikeet